The sea ducks (Mergini) are a tribe of the duck subfamily of birds, the Anatinae. The taxonomy of this group is incomplete. Some authorities separate the group as a subfamily, while others remove some genera. Most species within the group spend their winters near coastal waters. Many species have developed specialized salt glands to allow them to tolerate salt water, but these are poorly developed in juveniles. Some of the species prefer riverine habitats. All but two of the 22 species in this group live in far northern latitudes.

The fish-eating members of this group, such as the mergansers and smew, have serrated edges to their bills to help them grip their prey and are often known as "sawbills". Other sea ducks forage by diving underwater, taking molluscs or crustaceans from the sea floor. The Mergini take on the eclipse plumage during the late summer and molt into their breeding plumage during the winter.

Species
There are twenty-two species in ten genera:
Genus Clangula
 Long-tailed duck (formerly oldsquaw) (Clangula hyemalis)
Genus Histrionicus
 Harlequin duck (Histrionicus histrionicus)
Genus †Camptorhynchus
 †Labrador duck (Camptorhynchus labradorius) (extinct) 
Genus Polysticta
Steller's eider (Polysticta stelleri) 
Genus Somateria, the eiders. These are large marine ducks. The drakes have body plumage showing varying amounts of black and white, and distinctive head patterns. Females are brown.
 Spectacled eider (Somateria fischeri) 
 Common eider (Somateria mollissima)
 King eider (Somateria spectabilis)
Genus  Melanitta, the scoters. These are stocky marine ducks. The drakes are mostly black and have swollen bills. Females are brown.
 Common scoter (Melanitta nigra)
 Black scoter or American scoter (Melanitta americana) (sometimes considered a subspecies of M. nigra)
 Velvet scoter (Melanitta fusca) 
 White-winged scoter (Melanitta deglandi)  (sometimes considered a subspecies of M. fusca) 
 Surf scoter (Melanitta perspicillata)
Genus Bucephala, the goldeneyes. These are less marine than some species in this group, and will winter on fresh water. Drakes have white bodies with black backs and distinctive head markings. Females are grey with chestnut heads.
Common goldeneye (Bucephala clangula)
Barrow's goldeneye (Bucephala islandica)
Bufflehead (Bucephala albeola)
Genus Mergellus (sometimes included in Mergus)
 Smew (Mergellus albellus)
Genus Lophodytes (sometimes included in Mergus)
 Hooded merganser (Lophodytes cucullatus)
Genus Mergus, the typical mergansers. These are the least marine of this group, only red-breasted and common mergansers being common on the sea. These are large saw-billed ducks which dive for fish.
 Red-breasted merganser (Mergus serrator)
 †New Zealand merganser (Mergus australis)
 Common merganser or goosander (Mergus merganser)
 Brazilian merganser (Mergus octosetaceus) 
 Scaly-sided merganser (Mergus squamatus)

Below is a phylogeny based on a mitogenomic study of the placement of the Labrador duck and the diving "goose" Chendytes lawi.

References

 SeaDucks.org - Science and Management Reference